Margaret Tollerton (born 13 August 1958) is an Irish equestrian. She competed in two events at the 1984 Summer Olympics.

References

External links
 

1958 births
Living people
Irish female equestrians
Olympic equestrians of Ireland
Equestrians at the 1984 Summer Olympics
Place of birth missing (living people)
20th-century Irish women